Arantxa Sánchez Vicario was the defending champion, but did not compete this year.

Magdalena Maleeva won the title by defeating Ai Sugiyama 6–3, 6–4 in the final.

Seeds
The first four seeds received a bye to the second round.

Draw

Finals

Top half

Bottom half

References

External links
 Official results archive (ITF)
 Official results archive (WTA)

Silicon Valley Classic
1995 WTA Tour